Sridevi Soda Centre is a 2021 Indian Telugu-language romantic action drama film written by Nagendra Kasi and directed by Karuna Kumar and produced by Vijay Chilla and Shashi Devireddy under the banner of 70mm Entertainments. The film stars Sudheer Babu and Anandhi while Naresh and Satyam Rajesh play supporting roles. The film was released theatrically on 27 August 2021.

Synopsis 
Lighting Suri Babu is an expert in lighting arrangements in his village and aspires to start a shop with the same business. He falls in love with Sridevi whose family business is a Soda center run by her father Sanjeev Rao. Sridevi reciprocates the love but her father disagrees as Suri Babu doesn’t belong to his caste. Suribabu gets tangled in a murder case while a big shot in the village, Kasi becomes another big trouble for him. How Suribabu overcomes the struggle to win his love forms the story.

Cast 
 Sudheer Babu as "Lighting" Soori Babu
 Anandhi as "Sodaala" Sridevi
 Pavel Navageethan as Kasi
 Naresh as Sanjeev Rao, Sridevi's Father
 Satyam Rajesh as Karri Durga Rao, Soori Babu's Friend
 Raghu Babu as Narsayya, Soori Babu's Father
 Praveen as Chitturi Siva
 Kalyanee Raju as Dhanalakshmi, Sridevi's Mother
 Ajay as Kodi Katthi Seenu
 Harsha Vardhan as Prasad
 Rohini as Padma
 Saptagiri as Revu Nagaraju
 Sneha Gupta in an item number in the song "Mandhuloda".

Soundtrack

Reception 
Thadhagath Pathi of The Times of India rated the film 3/5 and he termed it "a powerful story with a gut-wrenching ending". Sangeetha Devi Dundoo of The Hindu in a more mixed review opined that overdoing the mainstream indulgences pulled the film down. "Sridevi Soda Center is the kind of film that happens when art-house and mainstream meet midway but it is not seamless. There are a few memorable moments and hard-hitting segments, but the film doesn’t sweep you off your feet," she added.

A reviewer from Deccan Chronicle rated the film 2.5 stars of 5 and called it "partly engaging." While appreciating the performances of Babu of Anandhi individually, they wrote that the love and chemistry between them was weak. Bhuvanesh Chandar of Cinema Express criticized the film for its "predictable, hardly engaging screenplay."  Chandar was disappointed because the film showed "a lot of promise and scope" that went underutilised.

References

External links 
 

2020s Telugu-language films
2021 films
Indian action drama films
2021 action drama films
Films set in Andhra Pradesh
Films shot in Andhra Pradesh
Films scored by Mani Sharma
Films directed by Karuna Kumar
70mm Entertainments films